Mark Brouard is Helen Morag Fellow and Tutor in Chemistry at Jesus College, and is a professor of chemistry at the University of Oxford, where he is currently Head of the Department of Chemistry. He is a specialist in reaction dynamics. In collaboration with professor Claire Vallance, Brouard has created the PImMS (Pixel Imaging Mass Spectrometry) sensor, claimed to be "the fastest camera in the world", which is used to detect particles.

Selected publications
 Tutorials in Molecular Reaction Dynamics. Royal Society of Chemistry, 2010. (Joint editor with Claire Vallance)

References

External links

Living people
Year of birth missing (living people)
Fellows of Jesus College, Oxford
Alumni of Wadham College, Oxford
Alumni of Linacre College, Oxford